Ambatomanga may refer to:

 Ambatomanga, Arivonimamo, Madagascar
 Ambatomanga, Manjakandriana, Madagascar